Luke Nolen (born 12 March 1980) is an Australian jockey best known for riding mare Black Caviar to 22 of her 25 consecutive wins. 

Nolen is from the rural town of Manangatang in northern Victoria. Beginning in Queensland country races, he has been riding professionally since 1998. 

As of 9 April 2022, Nolen has ridden 1,835 winners, including 38 in Group One races. He won 14 of his 38 Group One winners on Black Caviar. He won the Melbourne jockeys' premiership three seasons in a row: 2009/10, 2010/11 and 2011/12.

References

External links
 Jockey Profile from Racing Victoria

1980 births
Living people
Australian jockeys